Vazgaikiemis is a village in Prienai district municipality, in Kaunas County, central Lithuania. According to the 2011 census, the town has a population of 41 people.

Equestrian 
Village is famous because of its show jumping field. Vaizgaikiemis hosts National Lithuanian Equestrian jumping championships and various international events. In 2010, Vaizgaikiemis hosted FEI World Cup Jumping 2010/2011 North Sub-League 6th stage. In 2012, the Lithuanian Show jumping Nations Cup horse show was held here.

References

Prienai
Villages in Kaunas County